Events in the year 2023 in Guyana.

Incumbents
 President: Irfaan Ali
 Prime Minister: Mark Phillips

Events
Ongoing — COVID-19 pandemic in Guyana

Deaths
29 January – Gordon Rohlehr, literary scholar and critic (born 1942).

See also
List of years in Guyana

References

 
2020s in Guyana
Years of the 21st century in Guyana
Guyana
Guyana